Livo is a comune (municipality) in the Province of Como in the Italian region Lombardy, located about  north of Milan and about  northeast of Como, on the border with Switzerland. As of 31 December 2004, it had a population of 212 and an area of 32.5 km².

Livo borders the following municipalities: Cama (Switzerland), Domaso, Dosso del Liro, Gordona, Peglio, Samolaco, Vercana.

Demographic evolution

References

Cities and towns in Lombardy